KBBS (1450 AM) is a commercial radio station licensed to Buffalo, Wyoming. The station carries a classic country format, primarily originating from Cumulus Media. The station is currently owned by Big Horn Mountain Radio Network, a division of Legend Communications of Wyoming, LLC.

The station's 1,000 watt signal covers most of north central Wyoming, and can be received in Gillette when conditions are favorable.

KBBS also broadcasts local high school sports and University of Wyoming athletics programming. KBBS is located in the same facility as KLGT, and KZZS, at 1221 Fort Street, in Buffalo. The KBBS transmitter site is just south of Buffalo, on Stockyard Road.

In 2016, the station added an FM translator on 103.5, covering Buffalo and the immediate surrounding area.

References

External links

BBS
Classic country radio stations in the United States
Radio stations established in 1976
1976 establishments in Wyoming